is a junction railway station in the city of Akita, Akita Prefecture, Japan, operated by East Japan Railway Company (JR East).

Lines
Oiwake Station is served by the Ōu Main Line, and is located 311.7 km from the starting point of the line at Fukushima Station.

Station layout
The station has a single side platform and an island platform connected to the station building by a footbridge. The station is staffed.

Platforms

History
Oiwake Station opened on October 21, 1902 as a station on the Japanese Government Railways (JGR). JGR became the Japanese National Railways (JNR) after World War II. The station was absorbed into the JR East network upon the privatization of JNR on April 1, 1987.

Passenger statistics
In fiscal 2018, the station was used by an average of 1653 passengers daily (boarding passengers only).

Surrounding area
 
 Oiwake Post Office

See also
List of railway stations in Japan

References

External links

 JR East station information 

Railway stations in Akita Prefecture
Ōu Main Line
Railway stations in Japan opened in 1902
Oga Line
Buildings and structures in Akita (city)